Buck was a monthly men's magazine based in London, the United Kingdom, and available internationally, focusing on fashion, design and food. It was launched on 30 October 2008 as an independent title edited by Steve Doyle. The magazine was part of the Buck Publishing Ltd. Buck ceased publication on 5 January 2011.

References

 Brand Republic

External links
 Buck website

Men's magazines published in the United Kingdom
Monthly magazines published in the United Kingdom
Defunct magazines published in the United Kingdom
Magazines published in London
Magazines established in 2008
Magazines disestablished in 2011
Men's fashion magazines